Mathilde "Tig" O'Callaghan Notaro (born March 24, 1971) is an American stand-up comedian, writer, radio contributor, and actress. She is known for her deadpan comedy. Her acclaimed album Live was nominated in 2014 for the Grammy Award for Best Comedy Album at the 56th Annual Grammy Awards. The special Tig Notaro: Boyish Girl Interrupted was nominated in 2016 at the 68th Primetime Emmy Awards for Outstanding Writing for a Variety Special. In 2017, the album Boyish Girl Interrupted was nominated for the Grammy Award for Best Comedy Album at the 59th Annual Grammy Awards.

Early life
Notaro was born in Jackson, Mississippi, the daughter of Mathilde "Susie" O'Callaghan and Pat Notaro. Her mother was born in New Orleans. Notaro lived in Pass Christian, Mississippi until going to kindergarten. Later her family moved to Spring, Texas which is a suburb of Houston. She has a brother, Renaud, who is a year older and works as a radio talk show host. "Tig" is a childhood nickname given to her by her brother when she was two years old.

Notaro's maternal great-great-grandfather was John Fitzpatrick; he was the mayor of New Orleans from 1892 to 1896. While taking part in season 5 of Finding Your Roots with Henry Louis Gates, Jr., Notaro found out that she is also a distant cousin of Gloria Steinem.

In an interview with Mother Jones magazine, she said she disliked school. Notaro failed three grades eventually dropping out of high school. In 1990, while living in Texas, Notaro received her general equivalency diploma.

Notaro plays the guitar and drums; she was in bands when she was younger.

Career

An avid music fan, Notaro moved to Denver, Colorado, where she became involved in the music industry. She became a band manager, working under the name Tignation Promotions in the mid-'90s. Her work promoting bands took her to Los Angeles, where she tried stand-up for the first time in the late '90s. Notaro has since been featured on Comedy Central Presents and on The Sarah Silverman Program as a lesbian police officer. She collaborates frequently with her writing partner Kyle Dunnigan. With Dunnigan and David Huntsberger, she co-hosted the podcast Professor Blastoff from May 2011 until July 2015.

In 2011, Notaro released her debut stand-up album, Good One. Her 2012 album, Live, is a recording of a stand-up set performed shortly after she was diagnosed with breast cancer. In 2012, she appeared on Conan, and in May of that year on the live episode of This American Life, which was broadcast to theaters nationwide and on radio in edited form. She performed a monologue about having encountered Taylor Dayne on multiple occasions, greeting her each time with, "Excuse me, I'm sorry to bother you, but I just have to tell you. I love your voice."  After her monologue, Dayne made a surprise appearance, serenading Notaro with the song "I'll Always Love You". She worked on fellow comedian Amy Schumer's Comedy Central series Inside Amy Schumer. In June 2012, Notaro did a Kickstarter-funded series called Clown Service written by her and starring herself.

Notaro wrote a memoir for HarperCollins imprint Ecco called I'm Just a Person, and a Showtime documentary was made about her life which is about her post-cancer stand-up tour called Knock Knock, It's Tig Notaro. In July 2015, a Netflix movie called Tig which chronicles her attempts to become pregnant with her fiancée, Stephanie Allynne, was also released. The singer Sharon Van Etten wrote a song in homage to Notaro called "Words" that is shown in the credits.

In November 2015, Notaro co-wrote, produced, and starred in a semi-autobiographical TV pilot for Amazon Video called One Mississippi. The show received a six-episode series order from Amazon a month later. The show follows Notaro's character as she returns to her hometown of Bay Saint Louis, Mississippi, after her mother's unexpected death.

Her first stand-up one-hour special was released by HBO in 2015, Tig Notaro: Boyish Girl Interrupted.  In 2016, it was released as her third album on her own label, Bentzen Ball Records, which also put out Aparna Nancherla's Just Putting It Out There. In April 2018, it was announced that Notaro would appear in the second season of Star Trek: Discovery as Chief Engineer Jett Reno of the U.S.S. Hiawatha.

Netflix released Notaro's second one-hour special, Happy to Be Here, on May 22, 2018. She was digitally inserted in post-production in Zack Snyder's Army of the Dead, replacing Chris D'Elia, who was accused of sexual misconduct.

Comedic style
On her approach to comedy (and whether she considers herself a dark comic): "I'm always going to do whatever I think is funniest. If something's dark, I'll do it. If it's a sock puppet... There's no preconceived idea of who I think I might be now." Notaro said that since her cancer diagnosis, she has shifted not to darker comedy but rather to personal comedy. Previously she was more distant and observational, but now she reflects on her childhood and her life.

In the autumn of 2016, she appeared in a video as an onstage "stand-in" during the Nostalgic for the Present concert tour of Australian singer Sia for the song "Diamonds."

Personal life 
Notaro met her wife, Stephanie Allynne on the set of the movie In a World... They were engaged on January 1, 2015 and  married on October 24, 2015. They welcomed twin sons in 2016, conceived via a surrogate using Allynne's eggs.

Cancer 
Notaro was diagnosed with cancer in both breasts on July 30, 2012. On August 3, she addressed her cancer diagnosis and other personal difficulties during a live stage show at Largo in Los Angeles. The set has been described as  being "instantly legendary"; many comedians have praised her work.

The next day, comedian Louis C.K. called Notaro, telling her he wanted to release the audio of the show. She was uncomfortable with the idea at first, but decided the material could help people, so she agreed. C.K. made audio of the performance available that October for download on his site under the title Live. Notaro later released the audio (with booklet) on iTunes. Live ended up selling more copies than Kiss's album Monster, which debuted the same week, something Notaro said she never dreamed could happen. She was a fan of the band in her youth.

Notaro subsequently had a double mastectomy with no reconstructive surgery; she opted out of chemotherapy but decided to continue treatment with hormone blocking. In November 2014, as part of the New York Comedy Festival, Notaro did a set at Town Hall in New York City wherein she performed part of the set topless. The 
New York Times described it: "She showed the audience her scars and then, through the force of her showmanship, made you forget that they were there. It was a powerful, even inspiring, statement about survival and recovery, and yet, it had the larky feel of a dare." After a November 2014 show in Philadelphia, Notaro was hospitalized and required surgery for a cyst.

In 2017, Notaro adopted a vegan diet, which she credited for eliminating the chronic pain she had experienced in the years following her cancer diagnosis. She later earned a certification in plant-based nutrition.

Discography

Albums
 2011: Good One (Secretly Canadian) – CD+DVD, LP, download, streaming
 2012: Live (Pig Newton) – download, streaming
 2013: Live: Deluxe Edition (Secretly Canadian) – 2xCD, picture disc LP, LP, download, streaming
 2016: Boyish Girl Interrupted (Secretly Canadian) – CD, LP, download, streaming
 2018: Happy to Be Here (Netflix) – LP, streaming
 2022: Drawn (Comedy Dynamics) - CD, LP, download, streaming

Specials
 2004: Comedy Central Presents – download, streaming
 2015: Boyish Girl Interrupted (HBO) – download, streaming
 2018: Happy to Be Here (Netflix) – download, streaming
 2021: Drawn (HBO Max) - download, streaming

Videos
 2008: Have Tig at Your Party – also director, writer, executive producer (bonus DVD of Good One: Deluxe Edition)
 2013: Professor Blastoff – 100th Episode! – Earwolf – Video Podcast Network (YouTube)
 2014: The Moth – "R2, Where Are You" (YouTube) – also writer (the audio of the video is the bonus content of her album Live: Deluxe Edition)

Singles
 2016: "Mississippi Relatives" – download, streaming
 2017: 7-Inches for Planned Parenthood  – "My Ideal Exchange with a Stranger" (Live at Largo) (7-Inches For™, LLC) – 7" pink vinyl, download
 2020: "Little Titties" – download, streaming

Audiobook
 2016: I'm Just a Person (Harper Audio) – CD , download

Compilations
 2010: Live Nude Comedy, Vol. 1 (Salient Music) – download (tracks 11 and 12)
 2010: Comedy Death-Ray Xmas CD 2010 (ASpecialThing Records) – CD (song: We Are The World 25.75)

Filmography

Film

Television

Audio broadcasts

Radio
 2012–2016: This American Life Episodes 464, 476, 518, 558 and 577
 June 15, 2016: NPR All Things Considered
 July 18, 2015: NPR All Things Considered
 July 19, 2013: NPR Wait Wait... Don't Tell Me! "Not My Job"
 April 17, 2013: The Moth - "R2 Where Are You" Recorded December 5, 2012
 December 7, 2012: PRI Science Friday
 October 8, 2012: NPR Fresh Air

Podcasts

Hosted
 2020–present: Don't Ask Tig
 2020–present: Tig and Cheryl: True Story – cohosted with Cheryl Hines
 2011–2015: Professor Blastoff w/ Kyle Dunnigan and David Huntsberger (217 episodes)

Guest
 2019: Conan O'Brien Needs a Friend Episode 23
2017: 2 Dope Queens Episodes 26 & 45
 2017: The Ezra Klein Show
 2017: Movie Crush Episode 2
 2017: Good One: A Podcast About Jokes
 2017: Out Here In America Episode 2 and Bonus Episode
 2014, 2017: Bullseye with Jesse Thorn 2017, 2014
 2011, 2017: Jordan, Jesse, Go! Episode 175 and 501
 2009–2017: Comedy Bang! Bang! (12 episodes)
 2013: Making It Episode 67
 2013: You Made It Weird with Pete Holmes Episode 177
 2013: The Nerdist Podcast Episode 381
 2012–2013: The JV Club Episodes 32 and 49
 2011: The Long Shot Season 1, Episode 14
 2010-2011: WTF with Marc Maron Episodes 81 and 105
 2008-2011: The Sound of Young America 2011 Interview with Dave Holmes, Best Comedy of 2009, 2008 Stand-up at Bumbershoot

Books
 (Humor/memoir)

References

External links

 
 Tig Notaro on Facebook
 
 Tig Notaro at Secretly Canadian
 Official Bentzen Ball Records site 
 

 
1971 births
Living people
American film actresses
American television actresses
American women comedians
American stand-up comedians
American voice actresses
American women podcasters
American podcasters
Actresses from Mississippi
Actresses from Texas
People from Pass Christian, Mississippi
Actors from Jackson, Mississippi
People from Spring, Texas
Lesbian comedians
LGBT people from Mississippi
LGBT people from Texas
LGBT memoirists
21st-century American actresses
21st-century American comedians
Secretly Canadian artists
American lesbian actresses
American LGBT comedians